Charlotte Cross may refer to:

Charlotte Cross (Haven), a fictional character in the TV series
Charlottenkreuz ("Charlotte Cross"), a decoration of the Kingdom of Württemberg